Echeveria purpusorum is a flowering plant species from family Crassulaceae, endemic to Puebla and Oaxaca, Mexico.

Description 
The leaves color are deep olive-green, grey-green, or white-green, with red-brown markings.

References 

purpusorum